Pingryville is a village in the towns of Ayer and Littleton, Middlesex County, Massachusetts, United States. Massachusetts Route 2A and Massachusetts Route 110 pass through the community. It is named after John Pingry VIII (1799-1860) who was a local farmer and deacon of the church.

The community was mentioned in the song "Massachusetts" by Norwegian comedy duo Ylvis.

References

Villages in Middlesex County, Massachusetts
Villages in Massachusetts